Lamiinae, commonly called flat-faced longhorns, are a subfamily of the longhorn beetle family (Cerambycidae). The subfamily includes over 750 genera, rivaled in diversity within the family only by the subfamily Cerambycinae.

Tribes

The tribal level classification of the Lamiinae is still yet to be completely resolved. Lacordaire in the 1870s split the Lamiinae into nearly 94 tribes while the work of Bouchard et al. (2011) classified them into 80 tribes. Some tribes have been established for single genera and several genera have not been placed reliably within any tribe. Some of the tribes included below may not be valid and several have been synonymised.

Taxa incertae sedis:
 genus Cerambycinus Münster in Germar, 1839
 genus Cypriola J. Thomson, 1865
 genus Decellia Breuning, 1968
 genus Dorcadionoides Motschulsky, 1857
 genus Falsozeargyra Gilmour & Breuning, 1963
 genus Heteropalpoides Fisher, 1935
 genus Paralamiodorcadion Breuning, 1967
 genus Parmenops Schaufuss, 1891
 genus Prosoplus 
 genus Pterolophiella Breuning, 1952
 species Lamia bidens Fabricius, 1775
 species Lamia petrificata Heyden & Heyden, 1856
 species Lamia schroeteri Giebel, 1856

References

 
Cerambycidae